The 4th Light Cavalry Division was a French Army division active during World War II.

World War 2

Battle Of France
During the Battle of France in May 1940 the division contained the following units:

 4th Cavalry Brigade
8th Dragoon Regiment (8e Régiment de Dragons)
31st Dragoon Regiment (31e Régiment de Dragons)
 14th Light Mechanized Brigade
4th Armoured Car Regiment (4ème Régiment de Véhicules Blindés)
14th Dragoon Regiment (14e Régiment de Dragons Mécanisés)
 77th Divisionary Light Cavalry Artillery Regiment (77e Régiment d’Artillerie de Division Légère de Cavalerie)

It was a newly formed division.

References

Light Cavalry Division, 04
Cavalry divisions of France

AVN Award